Mohamed Obaid Hindi Al-Saadi (born 24 February 1994) is an Omani sprinter competing primarily in the 200 metres. He represented his country at the 2017 World Championships without advancing from the first round.

International competitions

1Did not start in the final

Personal bests
Outdoor
100 metres – 10.64 (+0.4 m/s, Mobile 2017)
200 metres – 21.02 (+1.4 m/s, Doha 2015)
400 metres – 47.09 (Doha 2015)

References

1994 births
Living people
Omani male sprinters
Omani people of Indian descent
World Athletics Championships athletes for Oman
Athletes (track and field) at the 2014 Asian Games
Athletes (track and field) at the 2018 Asian Games
Asian Games competitors for Oman
Islamic Solidarity Games medalists in athletics